Judy Bell (born September 23, 1936) is an American amateur golfer and golf administrator. She was inducted into the World Golf Hall of Fame in 2001 in the Lifetime Achievement category, which honors people who have made an exceptional contribution to the sport in areas outside of tournament wins.

Bell was born in Wichita, Kansas and took up golf at the age of ten, winning the girls' division in her first event - in a field of one. In 1950 she lost to Mickey Wright in the semi-finals of the U.S. Girls' Junior, which was to remain her best result in a United States Golf Association (USGA) event. She won the Broadmoor Golf Club Invitation three times and played for the United States in the Curtis Cup in 1960 and 1962. In 1967 she shot 67 in the U.S. Women's Open, which remained a record for 14 years.

Bell became a USGA volunteer in 1961, when she was a member of the Junior Championship Committee. In the 1970s she became a rules official. She later served on the Women's Committee and in 1987 became the first woman on the Executive Committee. In 1996 she was elected as the 54th President of the USGA, the first woman to hold the senior office in American golf. During her tenure and subsequently she played a leading role in programs to take golf to youth, minorities and the disabled.

Bell has been inducted into 11 halls of fame, including the World Golf Hall of Fame. She was among the first women to receive an honorary lifetime membership at the historic Royal and Ancient Golf Club of St. Andrews in 2015, and holds honorary memberships in eight other clubs in Scotland and the United States. In 2016, Bell received the Bob Jones Award, the USGA’s highest honor.

Team appearances
Amateur
Curtis Cup (representing the United States): 1960 (winners), 1962 (winners), 1986 (non-playing captain), 1988 (non-playing captain)

External links

American female golfers
Amateur golfers
Golf administrators
World Golf Hall of Fame inductees
Golfers from Wichita, Kansas
1936 births
Living people
21st-century American women